An expert report is a study written by one or more authorities that states findings and offers opinions.

In law, expert reports are generated by expert witnesses offering their opinions on points of controversy in a legal case and are typically sponsored by one side or the other in a litigation in order to support that party's claims. The reports state facts, discuss details, explain reasoning, and justify the experts' conclusions and opinions.

In medicine, an expert report is a critical assessment of a medical topic, for example, an independent assessment of the cost–benefit ratio of a particular medical treatment.

See also
Forensic science

References 

Legal literature
Medical literature

lt:Teismo ekspertizė
ru:Судебная экспертиза